2014 Denmark Open is a darts tournament, which took place in Esbjerg, Denmark in 2014.

Results

Last 32

References

2014 in darts
2014 in Danish sport
Darts in Denmark